Ormylia is a town and a former municipality in Chalkidiki, Greece. Since the 2011 local government reform it is part of the municipality Polygyros, of which it is a municipal unit. The municipal unit has an area of 88.002 km2. In 2011 Ormylia had a population of 4,282.

Institutions

The Ormylia Foundation: Founded by Archimandrite Aimilianos established to make a contribution for the benefit of mankind and culture in the tradition of Orthodox Monasticism. In February 2006, the Greek state, recognizing the social and scientific contribution of this monastic foundation, passed a special law approving its establishment as a public welfare institution under the name 'Ormylia Foundation' with the title 'Panagia Philanthropini Center'. The Foundation is a legal entity of private law and comes under the jurisdiction and supervision of the Minister of Economy and Finance, the Minister of Development, the Minister of Health and Social Solidarity and the Minister of Culture. It is governed by the provisions of its establishment act."

Panagia Philanthropini Center: "Center for Social Advancement, Disease Prevention and Medical Research, 'Panagia Philanthropini' was founded in 1982, eight years after the foundation of the Orthodox Christian Convent of the Annunciation of the Blessed Virgin Mary, in Ormylia, Chalkidike, northern Greece.... The mission of the Center is to comfort and alleviate the suffering of human beings without preference to race, religion, gender, or creed.... the Center provides high quality standardized cancer tests for the underserved."

References

External links

Populated places in Chalkidiki